Rupert William Anthony Friend (born 9 October 1981) is a British actor. He first gained recognition for his roles in The Libertine (2004) and Mrs. Palfrey at the Claremont (2005), both of which won him awards for best newcomer. He portrayed George Wickham in Pride & Prejudice (2005), Lieutenant Kurt Kotler in The Boy in the Striped Pyjamas (2008), Albert, Prince Consort in The Young Victoria (2009), psychologist Oliver Baumer in Starred Up (2013), CIA operative Peter Quinn in the political thriller series Homeland (2012–2017), Vasily Stalin in The Death of Stalin (2017), Theo van Gogh in At Eternity's Gate (2018), and Ernest Donovan in the series Strange Angel (2018-2019).

In the early 2020s, Friend began collaborating with director Wes Anderson, starting with a cameo in The French Dispatch (2021), followed by roles in Anderson's upcoming film Asteroid City and Netflix project The Wonderful Story of Henry Sugar. In 2022, he starred as disgraced British politician James Whitehouse in the series Anatomy of a Scandal and featured in the Disney+ series Obi-Wan Kenobi as the Grand Inquisitor.

Friend is director, screenwriter and/or producer of two award winning short films: The Continuing and Lamentable Saga of the Suicide Brothers (2008) and Steve (2010). He wrote lyrics for the Kairos 4Tet 2013 album Everything We Hold.

Early life and education
Friend was born in Cambridge. He grew up in Stonesfield, Oxfordshire, and attended The Marlborough School in Woodstock. Friend received his professional acting training at the Webber Douglas Academy of Dramatic Art in London.

Originally, Friend wanted to be an archaeologist and travel around the world after seeing Indiana Jones and the Last Crusade in 1989, but scrapped the idea after realizing that the occupation was perhaps not as exciting as Indiana Jones's adventures had led him to believe. Instead, he turned to acting, in which he was inspired by Marlon Brando who played Vito Corleone, and Daniel Day-Lewis, whom he described as his childhood hero.

Acting career

2004–2009 
Friend played three minor roles in a stage production of The Laramie Project when he was in his third year in drama school, and was spotted by a casting director. He made his acting debut as Billy Downs opposite Johnny Depp in the 2004 film The Libertine, for which he was named "outstanding new talent" at the 2005 Satellite Awards. He later stated that working with Depp so early in his career was a great lesson in film-acting. In 2005, Friend had his first starring role as Ludovic Meyer in the film adaption of Mrs Palfrey at the Claremont, in which he starred opposite Joan Plowright. In the same year, he portrayed George Wickham in Joe Wright's version of Pride & Prejudice.

Aged 22, Friend was offered a screentest for the part of James Bond after Pierce Brosnan stepped down from the role. He refused, because he felt he lacked the life experience necessary to play the role of Bond.

In 2009, Friend starred in the film Chéri, playing the title character opposite Michelle Pfeiffer. He joined the cast of The Boy in the Striped Pyjamas as Kurt Kotler, a lieutenant in Nazi Germany. In 2010, Friend played Albert, Prince Consort in The Young Victoria. Graham King, producer of Young Victoria, invited Friend to test for the lead role because he remembered his performance in Pride & Prejudice. His portrayal of Albert received acclaim, especially for his attention to detail and throrough preparation for the role. Friend said that the real challenge had been to find a way to portray the darker sides of an essentially good man like Albert, in order to give depth to the character. Around this time, a critic called Friend one of Britain's finest young actors.

2010–2019 

In 2010, Friend made his stage debut as Mitchell in the UK premiere of The Little Dog Laughed. He followed this with Dennis Potter's Brimstone and Treacle, in which he played the lead character to good reviews. He starred in the film The Kid, based on the novel by Kevin Lewis. As the film involves boxing, he trained to improve his physical and psychological shape. Critical reception of The Kid overall was less than favourable. He also starred in a French film called Lullaby for Pi, playing a singer called Sam. In 2011, he played Thomas Anders, the protagonist of the film 5 Days of War, which did not receive great reviews .

By 2012, Friend felt dissatisfied with his career and rethought his overall approach to his work and selecting his projects. He has dismissed reports in the media that at that time he considered giving up acting entirely. 

In 2013, he played the prison psychologist Oliver Baumer in the film Starred Up. His performance was applauded by critics and nominated for a BIFA Award for Best Supporting Actor. In 2015, he starred as Agent 47 in Hitman: Agent 47, a film based on the Hitman video game franchise, replacing Paul Walker. In order to play the role, he had to shave all his hair. He performed most of his own stunts. The production team sent him copies of all the Hitman games to familiarize himself with the character. However, Friend who calls himself a technophobe, was only able to walk his avatar in circles and soon gave up. The film received mixed reviews. In 2015, Friend provided narration for Nick Knight's folk horror fashion film, The Face of a Dying Dog.

Friend gained worldwide recognition as CIA operative and assassin Peter Quinn in the acclaimed political thriller series Homeland (2012–2017), his first role in a television-series. Introduced in season two as a supporting character, his role became significantly more important as of season three. His performance received widespread acclaim and he was nominated for three awards, including a Primetime Emmy Award nomination for Outstanding Guest Actor In A Drama Series in 2013. Friend's departure from the series was mourned by the press and fans. 

After his involvement in Homeland ended in 2017, Friend acted in a number of comedies. In a 2014 interview he had already said that he also wanted to explore the 'farcical side' to his acting. He was offered the lead role in Paul Feig's A Simple Favor, but turned it down to play a funny smaller part in the film instead. He was described as displaying "serious comedic chops" in Armando Iannucci's The Death of Stalin, where he played Stalin's son Vasily.

He was asked by director and painter Julian Schnabel to play Theo van Gogh in At Eternity's Gate (2018), an award-winning biopic about Vincent van Gogh who was played by Willem Dafoe. Friend played the role of the mysterious Ernest Donovan in the series Strange Angel from 2018 to 2019; his performance was praised as being 'of amusing weirdness and a creepy-crawly intensity'.

In 2018 Friend performed a new audio drama by John Patrick Shanley, Last Night in the Garden I Saw You, which featured Michelle Williams. The following year, Friend was asked by screenwriter David Koepp to narrate the audiobook of his debut novel Cold Storage. He voiced the character of Peter Hardy in the 2019 Gimlet scripted podcast Motherhacker.

2020–present 
In the early 2020s, Friend joined the group of actors regularly working with director Wes Anderson. The collaboration started with a cameo appearance as an actor playing a drill-sergeant in The French Dispatch (2021), and continued with a more substantial role in the upcoming film Asteroid City. He will play a leading role in Anderson's Netflix project The Wonderful Story of Henry Sugar, which began filming in 2022. This film is based on the stories by Roald Dahl, whom Friend has described as a hero of his.

In 2021, after his success portraying a spy in Homeland, Friend was once again mentioned as the possible next James Bond when Daniel Craig gave up the role. He played a lead role in the 2021 horror film Separation, which got largely negative reviews although Friend's performance as a single father did receive praise. The science fiction film Infinite (2021) in which he played the character Barton alongside Mark Wahlberg, was listed as one of the worst films of 2021.

The following year, Friend played network boss Wilson Sikorsy in Tim Kirkby's film Last Looks (2022), which got positive reviews. He starred opposite Sienna Miller and Michelle Dockery as James Whitehouse, a British politician on trial for rape, in the Netflix mini-series Anatomy of a Scandal. Friend initially turned down the role twice, because he did not feel enough affinity with the privileged Whitehouse. He was only persuaded to take on the part when director S.J. Clarkson challenged him to find a way to portray the humanity of the character. His acting was generally praised, with the series itself getting mixed reviews from critics.

Friend featured as the Grand Inquisitor in Disney+'s series Obi-Wan Kenobi (2022), an experience he said he enjoyed and would like to repeat. The role was physically demanding: the Grand Inquisitor's armour weighed 45 pounds and every day of shooting it took a team of makeup artists four hours to apply the makeup and prosthetics required for the role.

He will portray one of the main characters in the comedy series High Desert, with Patricia Arquette and Matt Dillon (in production). In February 2022, it was announced that Friend would play a lead role in Zack Snyder's science fiction film Rebel Moon; he withdrew from the project because of scheduling problems. He will be part of the QCode musical podcast series Cupid, planned for release in the summer of 2022.

On acting 
Friend’s work as a stage actor has been praised but he prefers film and television. In his own words, he 'would not like to do the same thing over and over again every night'. Initially, he was also reluctant to take on roles in longer running television shows; at first, he turned down the chance to audition for Homeland.

Friend has stated that he believes imagination is an actor's most important tool. He does extensive background research on his characters. For his role as Prince Albert in The Young Victoria he did historical research to get a better understanding of the character. He learned to ride a horse, walk, talk, play the piano and even write like Albert would have done. In his final Homeland season, his character Peter Quinn is recovering from a stroke and suffering from post-traumatic stress disorder. In preparation for the role, Friend spoke with veterans and medical specialists to help him portray these conditions realistically and with respect.

Director, screenwriter, producer and lyricist 
In 2008, Friend and Tom Mison wrote, produced and starred in a short film called The Continuing and Lamentable Saga of the Suicide Brothers. The film won Best Short at the Rhode Island International Horror Film Festival (2010). He founded his own production company called Beat Pictures, and he made his directorial debut with a short film in 2010 called Steve, starring Colin Firth, Keira Knightley and Tom Mison. In addition to directing, he wrote and produced the film, which was later included in the 2012 compilation Stars in Shorts. Steve won Friend the Rhode Island Film Festival Crystal Image Award, and was nominated for the Santa Barbara Film Festival Bruce Corwin Award for Best Short Film.

Plans for Friend to write, direct and star in a feature-length road movie about confidence tricksters called Barton & Charlie & Checco & Bill were mentioned in the media in 2014–2015, but the project did not materialise. In 2018, plans were announced for the feature film Cornerman about boxing trainer Cus D'Amato, with Friend to write and direct and Bruce Willis playing D'Amato.

Friend was asked by Adam Waldmann, the leader of the jazz ensemble Kairos 4tet, to write the lyrics for a track on their 2011 album Statement of Intent, and was then asked to contribute lyrics for their 2013 album Everything We Hold, which received positive reviews. His lyrics were sung by Marc O'Reilly, Omar Lye-Fook and Emilia Martensson.

Personal life
From 2005 to 2010, Friend dated English actress Keira Knightley, whom he met when filming Pride & Prejudice. He met American athlete and actress Aimee Mullins in 2013, and they became engaged in December 2014. Friend and Mullins were married on 1 May 2016.

Filmography

Films

Television

References

External links

 
 Rupert Friend on the British Film Institute

1981 births
21st-century English male actors
Alumni of the Webber Douglas Academy of Dramatic Art
English male film actors
English screenwriters
English male screenwriters
Living people
People from Oxfordshire
21st-century British male actors
21st-century British actors
British screenwriters
British film directors